Mark X or mark 10 often refers to the tenth version of a product, frequently military hardware. "Mark", meaning "model" or "variant", can be abbreviated "Mk." 

Mark X or mark 10 can specifically refer to:

In technology

In military and weaponry
21-inch Mark 10 torpedo (1915), an American torpedo
21-inch Mark X torpedo (1939), a British wet heater torpedo
Spitfire Mk X, a Supermarine Spitfire reconnaissance variant with pressurised cockpit
Bristol Beaufighter TF Mk X, a major torpedo and strike aircraft of its day
Limbo (weapon) or Anti Submarine Mortar Mark 10 (1955), common British three-barreled mortar fitted to Royal Navy escort ships
Mark 10 nuclear bomb, a proposed weapon design that did not go into production
Mk 10 missile launcher, used to launch the Convair RIM-2 Terrier two-stage medium-range naval surface-to-air missile (SAM)
Martin-Baker Mk.10, an ejection seat

Other vehicles
Jaguar Mark X, a large British automobile
Toyota Mark X, a Japanese automobile
Lincoln Mark X, an American concept car based on the Lincoln MK9
Lincoln MKX, an American car referred to at its inception as the "Mark-Ex"

Other uses
 Mark 10 or Mark X, the tenth chapter of the Gospel of Mark in the New Testament of the Christian Bible

See also
 X mark
 MKX (disambiguation)
 mk10 (disambiguation)